The Rink Hockey European Female League, formerly CERH Women's European Cup (before 2018), is an annual club roller hockey competition organized by World Skate Europe and contested by the top ranked teams in European domestic leagues.

The most successful club is Voltregà and  Gijón, having won six titles.

Finals

Performances

By club

By country

External links
 CERH official website

 
Roller hockey competitions in Europe
Women's roller hockey
2007 establishments in Europe
Sports leagues established in 2007
Multi-national professional sports leagues